The Denel Land Systems GI-2 is an autocannon manufactured by Denel Land Systems (DLS) and used by the South African Army, Navy, Air Force, Royal Thai Navy and Indonesian Navy.

History 
The Denel GI-2 is based on the GIAT Modèle F2 gun design, for which Denel has a production license.

Description 
The 20 mm GI-2 is a mounted monotube gun, with two 150-cartridge boxes on each side of the piece. After each shot, the empty cartridge is ejected from beneath the weapon. A hydraulic rearming device is available for naval or land versions.

Applications 

The GI-2 cannon is used in the following applications:

Land
 On Denel LCT 20 compact turret
 Ratel-20
 Eland-20
 Panhard AML H-20

Air
 Denel Rooivalk
 Super Hind upgrade of Mil Mi-24 helicopters by Advanced Technologies & Engineering
 IAR 330, a Romanian-built version of the Aérospatiale SA 330 Puma helicopter

Naval
 Manually operated deck gun mounts
 Reutech Super Rogue remote weapons station (RWS)
 Suncraft RALCO remote weapons station
Sigma-class design ships built for various clients by Damen Schelde Naval Shipbuilding

Users
  Algerian Air Force: Used in the upgraded Super Hind attack helicopter.
  Azerbaijani Air Forces: Used in the upgraded Super Hind attack helicopter
  Benin Navy: Reutech Super Rogue RWS
  Indonesian Navy: Diponegoro class corvette, Rigel class MPRV, Clurit class FAC & Pattimura class corvette.
  Kenya Air Force: For IAR 330 helicopters.
  Nigerian Navy: Suncraft RALCO RWS on patrol boats.
  South African National Defence Force: Used in land, air and naval applications.
  Royal Thai Navy: HTMS Narathiwat, HTMS Pattani, Patrol boats 228, 229, 230

References

Post–Cold War weapons of South Africa
Cold War weapons of South Africa
Autocannon
20 mm artillery
Denel